Lyubov Igorevna Nikitina (born 21 January 1999) is a Russian freestyle skier who competes internationally.

She participated at the 2018 Winter Olympics and the FIS Freestyle Ski and Snowboarding World Championships 2019, winning a medal.

Her brother Stanislav Nikitin is also a freestyle skier.

World Cup podiums

Individual podiums
 0 wins
 3 podiums

Team podiums
 2 wins
 3 podiums

References

External links

1999 births
Living people
Russian female freestyle skiers
Olympic freestyle skiers of Russia
Freestyle skiers at the 2018 Winter Olympics
Freestyle skiers at the 2022 Winter Olympics
Sportspeople from Yaroslavl
Universiade silver medalists for Russia
Universiade bronze medalists for Russia
Universiade medalists in freestyle skiing
Competitors at the 2019 Winter Universiade
20th-century Russian women
21st-century Russian women